The discography of American metalcore band Crown the Empire consists of four studio albums, one compilation album, one EP, 30 singles and 25 music videos. Crown the Empire released their debut album titled The Fallout in November 2012 and charted in the US, peaking at 1 on the Top Heatseekers albums. In July 2014, they released The Resistance: Rise of The Runaways, which peaked at 1 on both the Top Independent Albums, Top Hard Rock Albums and was their first release that charted abroad, peaking at 184 in the UK. Their third album Retrograde was released on July 22, 2016. Their most recent album, Sudden Sky, was released on July 19, 2019.

Albums

Studio albums

Compilation albums

Notes

Extended plays

Singles

Featured singles

Music videos

References 

Heavy metal group discographies
Discographies of American artists